Dr. J Dudley Woodberry (born 1934) is dean emeritus and senior professor of missions at Fuller Theological Seminary School of World Missions, specializing in Islamic studies. While most of Woodberry's time is currently spent teaching and writing for scholarly publications, he has also served as a missionary and teacher in Pakistan, Saudi Arabia, and Afghanistan (amongst many other Islamic countries). Woodberry has acted as editor for (from most recent to oldest): Paradigm Shifts in Christian Witness: Insights from Anthropology, Communication, and Spiritual Power (2008); Resources for Peacemaking in Muslim-Christian Relations: Contributions from the Conflict Transformation Project (2006); Muslim and Christian Reflections On Peace: Divine and Human Dimensions (2005); Reaching the Resistant: Barriers and Bridges for Mission (1998); Missiological Education for the Twenty-First Century: The Book, the Circle, and the Sandals (1996); and Muslims and Christians on the Emmaus Road: Crucial Issues in Witness Among Muslims (1991)

Woodberry's primary contribution to the field of Islamic-Christian relations has been in the area of Christian evangelism to Muslims, theological comparative works, as well as numerous reflections and articles concerning relevant topics in the world of Christian Muslim relations. Woodberry also emphasizes a holistic approach to missions that is theologically sound, learned in behavioural sciences, and is not ignorant of mission and church history.

Background 

Woodberry was born to American missionary parents working in the Chinese province of Shandong in 1934. He became a Christian "in a childlike way" at the age of three while his family was on furlough back in the States. Upon returning to China, Woodberry recalls surviving an incident where he fell into the freezing Yantai harbour and barely survived the subsequent pneumonia. This incident (in Woodberry's own words), "led to a sense that I had been saved for a purpose". Woodberry would later be sent to the China Inland Mission School in Chefoo where, due to the outbreak of World War II, he would be detained as a prisoner of war by the Japanese. Eventually Woodberry (and his brothers and sisters) were exchanged for Japanese civilians in America and, after a year of separation from his parents, he was reunited with them.

Life in America 

Woodberry began his life in America in Upstate New York after a brief stint at Cornell University where his parents studied agriculture. When his Father then decided to move back to China, Woodberry followed his mother and one sister to Nyack, NY where she taught missions at the Missionary Training Institute (now Nyack College). At the age of 13, Woodberry went to boarding school at The Stony Brook School in Stony Brook, Long Island, where he developed a strong work ethic and saw continued growth in his heart for missions.

Eventually choosing to attend Union College in Schenectady, New York, (where he obtained a Bachelor of Arts) Woodberry soon found himself growing restless and soon embarked on a ministry tour of Latin America – eager to ignite his passion for missions. It was at a stopover in Havana, Cuba, where Woodberry sensed he should enter seminary teaching "as a means of equipping indigenous Christians for ministry". His calling to specifically focus on evangelizing to Muslims was confirmed on a trip to Lebanon where he observed the Palestinian refugee camps and began to "sense some of the issues of peace and justice that must be part of a holistic Gospel".

Fuller Theological Seminary and American University of Beirut 

After time spent travelling, Woodberry enrolled at Fuller Theological Seminary where he would create the International Studies Program, and eventually arrive at the American University of Beirut where he would begin his formal Islamic studies under Arab Christian scholars and other notable personalities such as St John Philby. It was here in Beirut, after much time spent in study and travel, that Woodberry would eventually find his future wife, Roberta Smith, who was studying at the Beirut College for Women. Woodberry received a Masters of Divinity from Fuller, and an MA from the American University of Beirut. While in the Middle East, he also had the opportunity to study with scholars of Islam and Christian-Muslim relations such as Kenneth Cragg and Daud Rahbar.

Harvard Years 

Soon, Smith and Woodberry married and settled down in Cambridge, Massachusetts, where they welcomed their first two sons (John and Bob) while Woodberry continued his education at Harvard University. It was here in Massachusetts that Woodberry began his ministry to international students, as a staff member at Park Street Church where Harold Ockenga served as pastor. At Harvard, Woodberry studied under leading scholars in the field of Islamic studies including Sir Hamilton Gibb, George Makdisi, Wilfred Cantwell Smith, Seyyed Hossein Nasr, and Annemarie Schimmel who greatly influenced him though they may not have supported his calling to evangelize to the Muslims. His field of study, Islamic Fundamentalism, was seen as a topic of little value at that time. Woodberry would graduate from Harvard in 1968, having completed his Ph.D. in Islamic Studies and writing his dissertation on "Hassan al-Banna's Articles of Belief."

Pakistan, Afghanistan, and Saudi Arabia 

Sensing a call back to missions, Woodberry and his family moved to Pakistan with the support of the Presbyterian Program Agency of the United Presbyterian Church in the U.S.A. It was here that they gave birth to their third and final son, David.  During a furlough to Kabul, Afghanistan, Woodberry acted as an advocate for two Pakistani missionaries who had been incarcerated for handing out the Gospel of Luke. Due to Woodberry's knowledge of the Qur'an, he was able to develop an argument that would be accepted by the Muslim authorities and subsequently secured the release of the missionaries. It was due to this incident with the law that Woodberry began to further develop his thoughts regarding Christian ethics, specifically the limitations of government imposed law when it contradicts Christian commandments. From here, Woodberry continued to Saudi Arabia where he pastored a large church before being shut down by the government. Again, Woodberry used Muslim writings, a letter from the Islamic prophet, Muhammad, to Najran that allowed priests or pastors to continue in ministry as long as they paid the jizya, to eventually see the house churches re-opened. Eventually, with his family in mind, Woodberry returned to America to teach at Reformed Bible College (now Kuyper College) in Grand Rapids.

Zwemer Institute and further time at Fuller 

From Grand Rapids, Woodberry moved to California, where he was able to pursue a joint teaching position with the Zwemer Institute at the U.S. Center for World Mission and Fuller Theological Seminary. It was here that Woodberry had the resources to focus intently on missiological issues pertaining to Islam. After some initial reluctance, Woodberry accepted the deanship of Fuller's School of World Mission. Woodberry emphasizes a core curriculum containing "Word [theology of mission], World [behavioural sciences like anthropology], and Church [lessons from mission history and church growth]".

Dudley became the Dean of the School of Intercultural Studies at Fuller Theological Seminary.

References 

 Woodberry, Dudley J. Reaching the resistant: barriers and bridges for mission. Pasadena, CA: William Carey Library, 1998.
 "J. Dudley Woodberry." The Review of Faith and International Affairs. http://www.rfiaonline.org/authors/364-j-dudley-  woodberry (accessed March 1, 2011).
 "J. Dudley Woodberry." Fuller Theological Seminary: Faculty. http://www.fuller.edu/academics/faculty/dudley-woodberry.aspx (accessed March 1, 2011).
 Woodberry, Dudley J. "Islam's Culture War." Christianity Today Library (March, 2005). http://www.ctlibrary.com/ct/2005/march/28.83.html (accessed February 28, 2011).
 "My Pilgrimage in Mission: J. Dudley Woodberry." Mission Resources https://web.archive.org/web/20110707211323/http://bansuklee.com/xe/libms/65 (accessed March 1, 2011).

Footnotes

External links 
 Fuller Theological Seminary: School of Intercultural Studies
 Zwemer Center for Muslim Studies

1934 births
American Protestant missionaries
The Stony Brook School alumni
Harvard University alumni
Union College (New York) alumni
American University of Beirut alumni
Fuller Theological Seminary alumni
Christian scholars of Islam
Fuller Theological Seminary faculty
Living people
American expatriates in Pakistan
Protestant missionaries in Pakistan
Protestant missionaries in Saudi Arabia
Protestant missionaries in Afghanistan
American prisoners of war in World War II
World War II prisoners of war held by Japan